Free Bird Innovations, Inc. is an American aircraft manufacturer based in Detroit Lakes, Minnesota and formed in about 2003. The company specializes in the design and manufacture of ultralight aircraft in the form of plans and kits for amateur construction and ready-to-fly aircraft in the US FAR 103 Ultralight Vehicles category.

History
The two-seat Freebird II was introduced by the Freebird Airplane Company of Marshville, North Carolina at Sun 'n Fun in 1996. Two years later they brought out the single-seat Freebird I before going out of business. By 2000 both designs were being built by Pro Sport Aviation of Wingate, North Carolina, who also built a derivative single-seater, the Pro Sport Sportlite 103.

Free Bird Innovations took over the Freebird I and II designs and by 2004 was producing three derivative models, the single-seat Free Bird Sportlite 103 kit aircraft for the US FAR 103 ultralight category and the Free Bird Sportlite SS and Free Bird Sportlite 2 two-seaters. In 2007, they were building three further developed models, the single-seat Free Bird LiteSport Ultra and the two-seat Free Bird LiteSport II and Free Bird LiteSport Classic and continued those models through 2011. The LiteSport II model had been dropped by 2012.

Despite the LiteSport model name, none of the company's aircraft were ever listed by the US Federal Aviation Administration as light-sport aircraft.

The company had been developing a new model, the Freebird 103, originally projected for introduction in 2011, as a single seat US FAR 103 ultralight aircraft with a design empty weight under . The project received a setback when the lead project engineer, Eric Grina, was killed in a car accident in October 2011.

Aircraft

References

External links

Company website archives on Archive.org

Aircraft manufacturers of the United States
Ultralight aircraft
Homebuilt aircraft